Trentino is an Italian newspaper published in Trento, Italy.

The newspaper, which was first published in 1945, is Trentino's counterpart of Alto Adige, published in Bolzano. As of 2020, its editor is Pierluigi Depentori.

References

External links
 Official website

1945 establishments in Italy
Italian-language newspapers
Newspapers established in 1945
Daily newspapers published in Italy